Pentodontini is a tribe of rhinoceros beetles in the family Scarabaeidae. There are over 100 genera in the tribe Pentodontini.

Selected Genera
 Anoplognatho Rivers, 1888
 Aphonus LeConte, 1856
 Bothynus Hope, 1837
 Coscinocephalus Prell, 1936
 Euetheola Bates, 1888
 Gillaspytes Howden, 1980
 Orizabus Fairmaire, 1878
 Oxygrylius Casey, 1915
 Pentodon Hope, 1837
 Pericoptus Burmeister, 1847
 Thronistes Burmeister, 1847
 Tomarus Erichson, 1847 (carrot beetles)

References

Further reading

 
 
 

Dynastinae